Battle Tapes is an American electronic rock band, based in Los Angeles, California, United States, formed in late 2010. The band originally consists of Josh Boardman (vocals/guitar/synth), Riley Mackin (keyboards/programming/vocals), Stephen Bannister (bass guitar) and Pete Kraynak (drums/percussion). Battle Tapes is known for its live performances, fully sequenced lighting and visuals and integrating electro and indie influences into its music and image.

To date, Battle Tapes has released four EPs: Sleepwalker (2011), Sweatshop Boys (2012), Solid Gold (2016), and Form (2017). They released their first studio album Polygon on November 20, 2015. They released several singles: Valkyrie (Radio Edit) (2015), No Good (2017), Weight of the World (2019), If Only (2022) and In Too Deep (2022). Their upcoming album Texture will be released on May 5, 2023.

Battle Tapes gained increased popularity in 2013, when their song "Feel the Same," from the Sweatshop Boys EP, was featured in Rockstar Games’ Grand Theft Auto V video game, in a vehicle radio station, Radio Mirror Park. The band also gained additional popularity in 2018, when several of their songs were featured in the Rooster Teeth web series “Gen:Lock”, with “Belgrade” used as its main theme.

Battle Tapes made their festival debut in 2014, performing at The Sunset Strip Music Festival in Los Angeles, as well as SXSW in Austin, Texas. In early 2015, Battle Tapes announced they would be playing at the BottleRock Napa Valley Festival in May later that year.

Discography

Studio albums

Extended plays (EP)

Singles

Remixes (by other artists)

Remixes (by Battle Tapes) 
Some of these remixes were never officially released on any streaming platforms.

Skeleton Crüe
Josh Boardman and Riley Mackin often perform as a duo under the moniker "Skeleton Crüe" — a name derived from the stripped-down size of Battle Tapes, focusing more on a live DJ-style use of drum machines, samplers and synths, in addition to traditional DJ decks.

In other media
Teen Wolf  (season 3, episode 4)  -  "Made"
Grand Theft Auto V - "Feel the Same"
Elementary (season 2, episode 4) - "Sleepwalker"
National Geographic Channel (Ad Campaign) - "Sweatshop Boys"
BBC One - Casualty (Series 32 finale promo) - "Feel the Same"
Need for Speed (Trailer) - "Feel the Same"
The Originals (season 1, episode 17) - "Feel the Same"
NBC Sports (Formula 1/Monaco GP) - "Feel the Same"
State of Affairs (season 1, episode 12) - "Feel the Same"
Need for Speed (drift races) - "Valkyrie"
Asphalt Xtreme - "Belgrade"
Lucifer (season 1, episode 2) - "Valkyrie"
Bones (season 9, episode 14) - "Sweatshop Boys"
Now You See Me 2 - "Belgrade"
Girls - "Solid Gold"
Lethal Weapon - "Made"
The Crew 2 - "Dreamboat" & "Mulholland"
Asphalt 9: Legends - "Valkyrie"
S.W.A.T. - (season 3, episode 14) - "Made"
Gen:LOCK (Web series) - "Belgrade" (Main theme), "Syntax" (season 1, episode 2), "Alive" (season 1, episode 3), "Sweatshop Boys" (season 1, episode 4), "Last Resort & Spa" (season 1, episode 4), "Weight of the World" (season 1, episode 8)
Xbox Elite Wireless Controller Series 2 (Announce Trailer) - "Feel the Same"
The Blacklist (season 4, episode 21) - "Belgrade"
Hyper Scape - "Feel the Same"
Invincible (TV series) (episode 5) - "Alive"
The Naked Director (season 2 trailer) - “In Too Deep”

References

External links
Rockstar Network - Battle Tapes interview
Battle Tapes
Rave's Faves - Battle Tapes
BottleRock band of the day - Battle Tapes
 Battle Tapes Website

Musical groups established in 2010
Musical groups from Los Angeles
2010 establishments in California